Halieutopsis ingerorum, also known as Ingers' deepsea batfish, is a species of fish in the family Ogcocephalidae.

It is found in the Western Indian Ocean in the vicinity of the Mozambique Channel and also in the Northwest Pacific around Taiwan.

Etymology
The fish is named in honor of Robert F. Inger.

References

Ogcocephalidae
Marine fish genera
Fish described in 1988
Taxa named by Margaret G. Bradbury